Littlebeck is a hamlet in the Eden District in the English county of Cumbria, located near the small village of King's Meaburn, the hamlet of Lankaber and the village of Morland. The nearest town is Appleby-in-Westmorland.

Littlebeck farmhouse is a Grade II listed building.

References

Hamlets in Cumbria
Eden District